Alma de hierro (English title: Soul of Steel) is a Mexican telenovela produced by Roberto Gómez Fernández and Giselle González for Televisa in 2008. It is a remake of the Argentinian production Son de Fierro with the characters' names rewritten and adapted to the Mexican audience.

On February 25, 2008, Canal de las Estrellas started broadcasting Alma de hierro weekdays at 10:00pm, replacing Pasión. The last episode was broadcast on August 28, 2009 with Los Exitosos Pérez replacing it the following day.

Starring Alejandro Camacho, Blanca Guerra, Jorge Poza, Adamari López, Alberto Estrella, Martha Julia, Rafael Inclán and Adrián Uribe.

Plot 
The protagonist of this telenovela, full of anecdotes and told in a comic way, is the Hierro family. José Antonio Hierro, a good man, friendly but overly zealous, whom even his wife calls Hierro, married Elena Jiménez 25 years ago  and now they have three children: Sebastian, Sandy and Wicho.   They have made a decent living working through Hierro's business, a delicatessen located in front of their home where, in addition to José and his family, Mimiche (Elena's mother) and Paty (Elena's sister) live, as well as Angelito (Jose's brother) and Ezekiel (whom Elena and Hierro took in from the streets and have raised as a child).

Sebastian lost his sight at the age of ten, so Elena stopped teaching to help him adapt to his new life. Today he has a degree in history and teaches the subject at the school where his brother Wicho studies, as well as the charming and rebellious teenager, Renata.

Sandy is her father's pride and joy and is studying medicine, but she also has a penchant for dancing and entertainment. She knows  that Hierro would never permit her to change professions, but she has the support of her paternal grandfather, to whom Hierro hasn't spoken in 30 years. They are estranged because Hierro cannot not forgive his father for discovering, at 40, that his sexual orientation had changed, becoming gay, and revealing the situation to his family and society. This, in Hierro's eyes, was what caused the illness and death of his mother.

Wicho is young, immature, rebellious and fun. He does not know what he wants, and you feel that he is the one who never gets attention in the family.

Both Sebastian and Wicho fall in love with the same girl, Renata Higareda, a rebellious teenager who happens to be the daughter of Saúl Higareda, the man Elena would have married before meeting Hierro. Saul, although years later he married another woman, could never forget Elena and, now divorced, he has returned to Mexico. With an important position in national education, he has called on Elena to work with him because he is determined to recover her, no matter what he has to do. This even includes facing the fact that Wicho has fallen like a fool for his daughter, Renata, while, at the same time, she has fallen in love  with the blind Sebastian, Elena's other son.

Mimiche, still wanting a wealthy family, has never been reconciled to her daughter Elena's marrying "a salchichonero", and supports and encourages an association between Saul and Elena. But when it becomes difficult, she decides that her other daughter (Paty) should win the public official as the son-in-law she wants. This complicates things and causes great pain to Angelito, who is in love with Paty, who sees him as her soul mate since neither of them has ever worked and lived like others. Paty has her feminine charms, her maiden name and her lineage, while Angelito is a particularly adept rogue who sets traps, creates intrigues and deceits that yield immediate results.

Soon the world is upside down. Saul, with his emergence in the lives of Elena's three children in addition to the other problem,  causes Hierro to defend his marriage, because everybody knows very well that the Hierros defend what they love.

The problem for the other two Hierro men, is facing their own blood, Hierro to Hierro, for Renata's love. To this fun triangle add Rita, Sebastian's assistant, who tries to break him up with Renata and win the love of Professor Sebastian, whom she in turn loves obsessively.

The fate of the love triangles, young and adult, takes unexpected turns in the reactions and actions of each of the Hierros, ending in a surprise that will leave important lessons to every member of this family which really does have an "Iron Soul."

Surprisingly, a story is added after the death of Sebastian Hierro, after he has proposed marriage to Renata; Rita manages to attack the driver where the couple traveled and leave him unconscious. Sebastian and Renata get into a limousine without realizing that the driver is Rita. Renata tells Sebastian that she feels dizzy, she faints, and Sebastian is upset; he starts crying, but then he also collapses.

Renata awakes desperate and confused, not knowing where she is; meanwhile, Sebastian, desperate, also does not know where he is, but hears Rita's voice. After telling Sebastian they'll finally be together, though he repeatedly denies this, he realizes it's useless. Rita threatens to kill him unless they make love. Rita ties him to a bed but the memories of him with Renata make her furious, leading her to lose control and take Sebastian to the edge of a pool and then throw him in. Remorseful, Rita tries to save Sebastian and in desperation he goes toward Rita, but she is forced to leave the pool and leave Sebastian in the water.

Sebastian is paranoid about the damage he has caused Rita and Renata asks for help to escape. Rita tries to kill Renata  threatening her with a knife but instead accidentally stabs Sebastian. Sebastian is determined to marry Renata before he dies, after the damage caused by Rita. Renata and Sebastian kiss, sealing their marriage. But Sebastian falls in the middle of surprised guests, and eventually dies.

Rita is transferred to a psychiatric clinic. While there, Rita, scissors in hand, says she loves Sebastian and her future is to be with him. Directs the scissors into her eyes, causing them to be cut. Renata goes to visit Rita and tell her she is pregnant with Sebastian's child, but realizes that Rita has no eyes. Hierro goes to see Rita at the hospital, when he comes into her room he finds her feet, dangling. Rita has hanged herself.

Diego regrets marrying Florence Elena and the baby, Florence is hijacked and taken to hospital where he is visited by Diego whom she runs, Gael appears in Renata's life and Wicho gets jealous and beats him up.  Mariana wants to fix Iron things but that he despises and decides to go to Los Angeles to Florence but in the end because they do not want your baby will be away from him after leaving Mariana taxi from the house of Rafah home of Iron and begins to mourn, the driver turns around and collide Marian this serious, should get the baby by cesarean section and the baby does not cry at birth, Major Hierro says that if something happens to your mom or your brother, he would be the culprit.

Few months later, Major communicates secretly with Hierro to tell him that he heard his grandfather say he will take his brother when they are discharged and asks him not to let it happen. Hierro leaves the hospital room with the baby, covering it with care not to hurt him, carefully planning to not be seen by Mariana's parents. Realizing that Hierro is in the hospital, they panic and ask why he was not barred from entering. Alfredo and Angela enter the room with the nurse and stay to see Mariana alone. Angela runs desperately to the baby's bed, realizes it is empty, and says Hierro stole the baby.

Hierro runs with his son who is hidden under his coat. Among the corridors of the hospital, he sees a glass door to the outside, but the door is closed, when he insists on opening the door a security man tries to stop him, several guards approach him, at gunpoint, telling him there is no way out. Hierro shouts that he is innocent and clings to his son. Alfredo, distraught, tells the doctor who has spent many days with his daughter and she's still the same, there has been no sign of hope, and his granddaughter does not stop mourning. He promises that whatever happens will be a private act between them, which nobody know, but they already need to end this ordeal, the doctor looks at him without answering. Doctors no longer have hope that Mariana will wake up. After a long coma, Mariana awakes when the doctors were about to disconnect her.

Mariana and Hiero kiss with much love. Abraham appears excited giving the news that Mariana's father withdrew the complaint and Hierro will be free, he says that the only important thing is that she is alive and both are in love. Diego proposes marriage to Elena, the family supports that decision, Hierro comes in and they all tense up, thinking he will react badly, yet he recommends that Elena accept Diego's proposal. A year later, a large engagement party  gathers for the whole Hierro family . Hierro and Elena finally have left things on good terms and everyone marries. Hierro and Mariana, Elena and Diego respectively.

Cast

Main
Alejandro Camacho as José Antonio Hierro Ramírez
Blanca Guerra as Elena Jiménez de la Corcuera de Hierro
Jorge Poza as Sebastián Hierro Jiménez
Zuria Vega as Renata Higareda Fontana
Alberto Estrella as Angel "Angelito" Hierro Ramirez
Martha Julia as Patricia "Paty" Jiménez de la Corcuera
Adrián Uribe as Ezequiel Hierro Jiménez
Eddy Vilard as Luis "Wicho" Hierro Jiménez
Angelique Boyer as Sandra Inés "Sandy" Hierro Jiménez
Flavio Medina as Amadeo López Velasco
Alejandra Barros as Mariana Camargo
Lisardo as Diego Galindo
Rafael Inclán as Ignacio Hierro González
Luz Maria Aguilar as Matilde "Mimicha" de la Corcuera Vda. de Jimenez
Adamari López as Rita Anguiano Carbajal
Juan Verduzco as Saúl Higareda

Supporting
 
Marifer Malo as Lorena Higareda
Gabriela Carrillo as Karina López Velasco
Marcia Coutiño as Maribel de López
Grettell Valdéz as Melissa
Miguel Rodarte as Aristeo "Ari" Villegas
Juan Carlos Colombo as Rafael "Rafa"
Moisés Suárez as Director Gregorio Ortega
Manzana as María José "Majo" Ibarrola Camargo
Delia Casanova as Mother Perpetua
Tiaré Scanda as Juliana Díaz
Isabel Madow as Arabella Gómez
Karla Cossio as Cynthia
Macaria as Ángela de Camargo
Manuel Ojeda as Alfredo Camargo
Marco Uriel as Fernando Arreola
Agustín Arana as Gibrán
Mark Tacher as Gael Ferrer
David Ostrosky as Alonso Ferrer
Álex Peniche as El Pájaro
Mario Prudomme as Javier Carbajal
Jéssica Mas as Florencia

Special participation

Isabel Benet as Ana
Darío Ripoll as Monchi
Lorena Velázquez as Victoria
Teo Tapia as Quintero
Luis Gatica as Abraham Elizondo
Patricio Castillo as Claudio
Maru Dueñas as Sonia
Odiseo Bichir as Osvaldo Ibarrola
Sherlyn Zuckerman as Danna
Gustavo Rojo as Pierre
Sergio Corona as Bernardo
Liza Willert as Cidronia
Mariana Ávila as Jessica
Juan Carlos Serrán as Rodolfo Molina
Juan Ignacio Aranda as Simón
Jana Raluy as Dr. Lizárraga
Nuria Bages as Rita's mother
Danny Perea as Carla
Dorismar as Romina
Christian Vega as Pedrito
Rafael Amador as Dr. Heredia
David del Real as Paparazzi

Deceased characters
Maribel de López - Dies in the hospital after the accident
Ari Villegas - Dies in the hospital after a car accident
Sebastian Hierro Jiménez - Stabbed by Rita and later dies during Renata's wedding
Rita Anguiano Carbajal - Stabs her own eyes and later commits suicide

Adaptation
The soap opera is an adaptation of the telenovela Argentina Son de Fierro and its characters and stories have similar treatment to the Argentine program. However, they changed the names of several of the characters. The clearest change is the name of the title family, which instead becomes Hierro. Martin Fierro became José Hierro, his wife Lucia becomes Elena, and Juan Sebastian becomes. Ezekiel, Sandra and Luis Hierro keep their names in the adaptation, only Sandra also maintains that although the nickname "Sandy" Luis is nicknamed "Wicho"instead of "Lucho" in Mexican adaptation. Mimiche also keeps the name, but his daughter Sissi renamed Paty. Grandpa Don Martin on the soap opera that Argentina shares a name with his son, here called differently, Ignacio.

At school level, the political leader José María Fontana renamed Saúl Higareda, Morena and her daughter becomes Renata. Morena's cousin, Luly, becomes Lorena, while Rita Maiden retains the name but not the last name, which happens to be Anguiano.

Some of the situations were also modified to acclimate to the Mexican scene. Hierro owned a butcher shop in Argentina's version, while the Mexican version of the successful business is a deli.

Rafa's character is Iron grandfather's partner in the original version. This was changed to make them just friends for the Mexican public. To give more strength to Rafa, this has become, well, best friend and advisor and Maria Elena.

Awards

References

External links

 at esmas.com 

2008 telenovelas
Mexican telenovelas
2008 Mexican television series debuts
2009 Mexican television series endings
Television shows set in Mexico City
Televisa telenovelas
Mexican television series based on Argentine television series
Spanish-language telenovelas